Marcus Arruntius Aquila may refer to:

 Marcus Arruntius Aquila (consul 66), Roman senator
 Marcus Arruntius Aquila (consul 77), Roman senator